Alliance Airlines (later known as SA Alliance Air) was a multi-national long-haul airline based at Entebbe International Airport in Uganda. It was set up in 1995 as a joint venture between South African Airways (SAA) and the governments of Tanzania and Uganda. The airline ceased operations in 2000.

History
The airline's formation was linked to the African Joint Air Services (AJAS) Accord which was signed in 1990 by Tanzania, Uganda and Zambia. The latter left in 1992 due to lack of funds. It began operations in July 1995 and operated a single Boeing 747SP leased from SAA, painted in the distinctive Alliance Air colour scheme.

Alliance Air had planned to serve Dar es Salaam, Dubai, Entebbe, Johannesburg, London and Mumbai. Flights to Rome would have been added at a later date. The launch of the airline sent shock waves to Kenya Airways, the dominant airline in the region.

It was renamed SA Alliance Air for a short while with an SA Alliance Express sister airline as well featuring a new logo based on the South African Airways flag inspired tail design. However this look was not applied to any aircraft.

Corporate Affairs
At inception the airline was led by Christo Roodt as its Managing Director. Members of the board included Michael Katz, Anton Moolman and Mike Myburgh from South Africa; Joseph Mungai and Adrian Sibo from Tanzania and Uganda respectively. In 1998, the airline bought a 49% stake in the Rwandan flag carrier Air Rwanda and operated as Alliance Express.

Ownership
Its effective shareholding was 40:30:30 owned by SAA, Tanzania and Uganda respectively. However, the actual ownership structure was as follows:

The airline had planned to offload 30% of its equity to Tanzanian and Ugandan investors and this block of shares were held in trust by the governments of the two nations. However, this never materialized.

Dissolution
Air Tanzania Corporation (ATC) left this venture in June 1998 and its departure was welcomed by the airline calling it a 'constant hindrance'. Uganda Airlines too parted ways the following year.

The joint venture was renamed to SA Alliance Air from 1999 until its demise. Transnet, the parent company of SAA ceased funding the airline in March 2000. Its rationale was to force the two nations in opening their regional and domestic routes to the airline, thus intending to make it the de facto regional carrier. ATC accused SAA of taking over national airlines of the region using the joint venture as a Trojan Horse. The airline required a monthly subsidy of US$420,000 in order to maintain its long haul flights. SAA was willing to fund its share of the deficit subject to the other partners willingness to fund the remaining 60%.

Uganda's transport minister said there were more than 50 areas of conflict with SAA. In October 2000, the Tanzania Chamber of Commerce, Industry and Agriculture (TCCIA) and Dairo Air Services (DAS) of Uganda offered to buy their governments' stake in the venture.

The airline ceased to operate in 2000 and its last flight, from London to Johannesburg, (via Entebbe) departed on 8 October. Both Tanzania and Uganda cited overdependence on SAA for the joint venture's going concern. It had accumulated losses to the tune of US$50 million

Destinations
During its lifetime, the airline served the following destinations:

References

Airlines established in 1995
Airlines disestablished in 2000
Defunct airlines of Uganda